North Mason School District is a public school district that serves North Mason County, Washington.

Schools

High schools 
North Mason High School (Belfair)
 James A. Taylor High School

Middle school 
 Hawkins Middle School

Elementary schools 
 Belfair Elementary
 Sandhill Elementary

Notable alumni 
David Skelly

References

External links 
 

School districts in Washington (state)
Mason County, Washington